"Love Takes Time" is a song by the soft rock band Orleans. It peaked at number 11 on the Billboard Hot 100 in May 1979 and was their biggest hit since their 1976 single "Still the One."  The song also reached number 13 on the U.S. Adult Contemporary chart.  In Canada, "Love Takes Time" peaked at #23 for two weeks.

It is arguably their third most popular song overall, behind "Dance with Me" and "Still the One," and their most popular song without lead singer John Hall. Written by Larry Hoppen and Marilyn Mason, it was the first track on the band's 1979 album Forever.

Critical reception
The song received mixed reviews. Though popular, the song was called "bubbly but shallow" by the Lawrence Journal-World.  Cash Box said it has "a strong, rolling chorus" as well as "synthesizer coloration, firm pounding beat, piano, searing guitar fills, tambourine and dynamic singing." Record World called it "a slick pop rocker right in the same mold [as previous Orleans' hits]."

Charts

References

External links
 

1979 singles
Infinity Records singles
Orleans (band) songs
1979 songs